HMT Amethyst was a naval trawler requisitioned by the Admiralty prior to the Second World War. She was sunk in the second year of the war.

Amethyst was built as the commercial trawler Phyllis Rosalie by Smiths Dock Company, South Bank-on-Tees and was launched on 15 January 1934.   Her first owners were the Boston Deep Sea Fishing & Ice Co Ltd, based at Fleetwood.  In 1935 she set a number of records for catches landed at Fleetwood, and was present at King George V's Silver Jubilee Spithead Review, representing the port of Fleetwood.  She was sold later that year to the Admiralty, who had her converted into an anti-submarine warfare trawler with the addition of ASDIC and a four-inch gun. They classed her and a number of other trawlers as the Gem group, and the name Amethyst was selected.

She continued to serve during the Second World War, but on 24 November 1940, whilst under the command of T/Lt. the W.K. Rous, RNVR, she struck a mine  in the Thames Estuary and sank.  There were no casualties, and the survivors were landed at Southend, where they were briefly arrested under suspicion of being survivors from a sunken German craft.

References

External links
Amethyst listed in ships launched from Smith's dock

Anti-submarine trawlers of the Royal Navy
Shipwrecks of the River Thames
1934 ships
Maritime incidents in November 1940
Ships sunk by mines